The Hinţeşti oil field is an oil field located in Moșoaia, Argeș County. It was discovered in 1984 and developed by Petrom. It began production in 1985 and produces oil and natural gas.

References

Oil fields in Romania